is a Japanese football player who plays for Mito HollyHock.

Playing career
Nakayama was born in Fukuoka Prefecture on January 11, 1993. After graduating from Kindai University, he joined J2 League club Giravanz Kitakyushu in 2015.

References

External links

1993 births
Living people
Kindai University alumni
Association football people from Fukuoka Prefecture
Japanese footballers
J2 League players
J3 League players
Giravanz Kitakyushu players
Mito HollyHock players
Association football goalkeepers